The Mountbatten Maritime Award is awarded annually by the Maritime Foundation (formerly the British Maritime Charitable Foundation) to the author of a distinguished publication that has made a significant contribution to the maritime history of the United Kingdom. The prize is a piece of silver plate. Before 2018 it was known as The Mountbatten Maritime Award for Best Literary Contribution. From 2018 it is known as The Mountbatten Award for Best Book. The Trustees of the Maritime Foundation award the prize based on the recommendation of an Awards Committee.

Recipients
Source: Maritime Foundation

Mountbatten Maritime Award
 2000 Rear-Admiral J. Richard Hill
 2001 Jim Ring, We Come Unseen
 2002 Andrew Williams and the BBC Battle of the Atlantic Team
 2003 Peter Padfield, Maritime Power and the Struggle for Freedom
 2004 Tom Pocock, Stopping Napoleon - War and Intrigue in the Mediterranean
 2005 Professor R. J. B. Knight, The Pursuit of Victory - The Life and Achievements of Horatio Nelson
 2006 Nicolette Jones, The Plimsoll Sensation
 2007 Captain Andrew Welch FNI RN Rtd, The Royal Navy and the Cod Wars
 2008 Tim Clayton, Tars: The Men who Made Britain Rule the Waves
 2009 Kate Lance, Alan Villiers: Voyager of the Winds 
 2010 Richard Guilliatt & Peter Hohnen, The Wolf: How One German Raider Terrorised the Southern Seas during the First World War
 2011 David Abulafia, The Great Sea: A Human History of the Mediterranean
 2014 Andrew Adams & Richard Woodman, Light upon the Waters: the History of Trinity House 
 2015 Barry Gough, Pax Britannica: Ruling the Waves and Keeping the Peace before Armageddon
 2016 Peter Hennessy & James Jinks, The Silent Deep: The Royal Navy Submarine Service Since 1945
 2017 Reginald Cogswell, Exeter: A Cruiser of the Medium Size
Mountbatten Award
 2018 David Mearns, The Shipwreck Hunter: A Lifetime of Extraordinary Deep-Sea Discoveries
 2019 Rachel Slade, Into the Raging Sea: Thirty-Three Mariners, One Megastorm, and the Sinking of El Faro

See also

 List of history awards
 List of literary awards
 List of awards named after people

References

Mountbatten Maritime Prize

History awards
Awards established in 2000
2000 establishments in the United Kingdom
Maritime history of the United Kingdom